Neanisentomon yuenicum is a species of proturan in the family Eosentomidae. 

It can be found in Southern Asia.

References

Protura
Articles created by Qbugbot
Animals described in 1984